Wayne Smith (born Ian Flemmings Smith, born 5 December 1965 – died 17 February 2014) was a Jamaican reggae and dancehall musician best known for his 1985 hit "Under Me Sleng Teng", which is regarded as the track which initiated the digital era of reggae.

Biography
Smith grew up in the Waterhouse area of Kingston, Jamaica. He performed with sound systems and began recording in 1980 at age 14, initially working with producer Prince Jammy, his next door neighbour, who produced his debut album Youthman Skanking (1982) and the 1985 follow-up Smoker Super.

His 1985 recording of "(Under Mi) Sleng teng", is generally regarded as the beginning of ragga style reggae. The rhythm was a preset pattern programmed into the Casio MT-40 by Okuda Hiroko who was still in her first year with the company after producing one of Japan's first master's theses on reggae. The lyrics were inspired by Barrington Levy's "Under Mi Sensi". Although there are a number of conflicting stories about how it was first found, the commonly accepted view is that Wayne Smith and Noel Davy discovered it. Smith had further hits with "Come Along" which used the Stalag riddim, and "Ain't No Meaning in Saying Goodbye".

After leaving Jamaica for New York in 1989, he established his own record label, Sleng Teng Records. He worked as well with several record producers from New York, Jamaica and Europe, such as Heartical Sound and Evidence Music. In 2011, Smith made his first European tour with Little Lion Sound from Switzerland. He returned to live in Jamaica in 2013 with his youngest daughter Arella and fiancé Fiona, settling in Mandeville.

Smith was admitted to Kingston Public Hospital on 14 February 2014 with severe stomach pains, and died on 17 February 2014, aged 48. He was survived by five children and three grandchildren.

Discography
Youthman Skanking (1982), Black Joy
Smoker Super (1985), Chartbound
Wicked Inna Dancehall, Rohit
Showdown Vol. 7 (1986), Hitbound – split with Patrick Andy
Under Me Sleng Teng (1986), Greensleeves
Sleng Teng + Computerised Dub (1986), Greensleeves – split with Prince Jammy

References

External links
Biography

Jamaican reggae musicians
1965 births
2014 deaths
Musicians from Kingston, Jamaica
Jamaican expatriates in the United States
Greensleeves Records artists